Sagar Alias Jacky Reloaded is a 2009 Indian Malayalam-language action thriller film directed by Amal Neerad. It is the sequel of 1987 film Irupatham Noottandu and Mohanlal reprise his role as Sagar Alias Jacky. The film was written by S. N. Swamy and produced by Antony Perumbavoor under the company Aashirvad Cinemas. It also features Suman, Shobana, Bhavana, Manoj K. Jayan, Jagathy Sreekumar and Sampath Raj in supporting roles.

Sagar Alias Jacky Reloaded released on 26 March 2009 and mainly received mixed-to-positive reviews from critics and audience with praise towards its direction, cinematography, musical score & soundtrack, action sequences and cast performances, but criticism directed towards its pace and writing. The film won the Kerala State Film Award for Best Choreography for Dinesh Kumar.

Plot
Sagar Alias Jacky is a powerful crime boss, who is known for solving problems among big gangs. The CM Chandrashekharan's son-in-law Manu is kidnapped and the cops are unable to find a clue. Manu's wife Indu realises that the police have been influenced by her brother Hari who seems to know the kidnappers. Indu decides to call her best friend Jacky to help find Manu. Jacky calls his henchmen all over Kerala for the job, where the gang travels to Goa where Jacky's contact tells him that the kidnappers are the Rosario brothers Michael "Big B" Rosario and David Rosario, who run the most powerful crime syndicate. After considerable difficulties, Jacky and his gang locate the night club where Manu is held hostage and helps him to escape. 

This audacity does not sit well with the Rosarios who swear vengeance against Jacky. They kidnap one of Jacky's favourite gangsters and demand ransom. Jacky responds by kidnapping two of the three Rosario brothers and demands that his man be released. Realising that they would never be able to defeat Jacky in a heads-on battle, the Rosario brothers make a deal with Manu and Hari to deliver Sagar's current location. The Rosarios then try to assassinate Jacky, but to no avail. Frustrated with repeated defeats, the Rosarios approach Jacky's former partner and rival Nanthakrishna Naina, who supplies them with an assassin named Sheikh Imran, who is also an internationally infamous assassin. 

Imran is asked to assassinate Manu so that the Jacky can be framed for the murder, but the Rosarios's plan backfires as Indu provides witness that Jacky was not responsible for her husband's murder. Imran is then asked to assassinate Jacky, where he manages to kill Jacky's bodyguard, but Jacky escapes. Jacky hunts down Imran and kills him. The Rosarios kidnap Jacky's love interest Arati, a news reporter, where Jacky is asked to arrive at a place to work out a deal. When Jacky reaches there, he finds Arati dead. Enraged, Sagar goes to the Rosarios' club and goes on a killing spree, where he later leaves to Dubai where Naina is hiding on a yacht. With the help of some gangsters, Jacky plants explosives on the yacht and blows it up. Jacky informs Indu that Manu's death has been avenged.

Cast

 Mohanlal as Sagar Alias Jacky
 Suman as Nanthakrishna Naina
 Sampath Raj as Michael "Big" Rosario
 Manoj K Jayan as Manu
 Shobana as Indu, Manu's wife
 Bhavana as Arati Menon
 Jinu Joseph as Ferad
 Jagathy Sreekumar as Ashok Kumar
 Nedumudi Venu as CM Chandrashekharan
 K. B. Ganesh Kumar as Hari
 Bala as SP Hamid 
 Shereveer Vakil as David Rosario
 Rahul Dev as Sheikh Imran
 Vinayakan as Style
 Anu Anand as Joseph
 Sumit Naval as Azar
 Prayaga Martin as Amina, Azar's sister
 Vanitha Krishnachandran as Azar's mother
 Sudhi Koppa as Babu, Attacker
 Pranav Mohanlal as a youngster (cameo appearance)
 Jyothirmayi as a beach dancer (cameo appearance)
 Ranjith Velayudhan as Rosario brother

Production
Trisha was approached for the female lead but she could not sign it due to her busy schedule. Later Bhavana replaced her. While writer S. N. Swami was working on the script of Baba Kalyani, its producer Antony Perumbavoor approached him with the idea of remaking Swami's earlier work Irupatham Noottandu. Swami contemplated the possibilities for a sequel. In the final events of the first film, the villain Shekharankutty died and Sagar is in Jail. Antony asked him after two years, and Swami suggested taking only the character Sagar and making a completely new film, neither a continuation nor a sequel. In Irupatham Noottandu, Sagar was an introvert who rarely smiles. Now, although the character has aged he is doing something that is not socially accepted.

Music

The film's soundtrack features six songs composed by Gopi Sundar, with lyrics by Gopi Sundar, Jofy Tharakan, Santhosh Varma and Riya Joy. The soundtrack was released by Manorama Music.

Reception 

Unni R Nair from Indian Express wrote that "Sagar Alias Jacky Reloaded fails to deliver and leaves you wondering what it was all about. It's technical brilliance wasted on an utterly nonsensical script." Sify.com wrote that "But Sagar alias Jacky is not an unwatchable movie. For the locations and look, it can be seen. But what could have been a fearless, edgy action thriller is ultimately only a half-decent enterprise because it lacks a strong story. You can watch it only because it?s a new format but for most parts prepare to be seriously bored" Paresh C Palicha from Rediff.com Wrote that "Amal Neerad's second directorial venture after Big B is just an average fare, which is a disappointment considering the high expectations"

Accolades
Kerala State Film Awards-Best Choreography - Dinesh Kumar

References

External links
 

2009 films
2000s Malayalam-language films
%Jacky2
Indian gangster films
Films shot in Dubai
Films shot in Kochi
Films scored by Gopi Sundar
Films directed by Amal Neerad
Aashirvad Cinemas films